There are many queens, princesses, heroines and witches in Ferdowsi's Shahnameh (Book of Kings), from the Iran, Turan, the Roman Empire, China, India etc.

List of Women in the Shahnameh 

 Arezo, daughter of Mahyar
 Arezo, wife of Salm
 Azadeh, the lover of Bahram V Gor
 Azarmidokht, Queen of Queens of Iran
 Arnavāz, wife of Zahak and later of Freydon
 Spanoy, a Turanian princess
 Banou of Gazor
 Banou of Gordoye
 Banou of Mahbod
 Boran, Queen of Queens of Iran
 Beh-Afarid, daughter of Kay Vishtasp
 Tahmina, mother of Sohrab and wife of Rustam
 Jarireh, the first wife of Siyavash
 Jamag, sister of Jamshid
 Rudaba, wife of Zal and the mother of Rustam
 Spinvad, an Indian princess and lover of Bahram V Gor
 Sudabeh, wife of Kay Kavus
 Sahi, wife of Iraj
 Sindukht, grandmother of Rustam
 Shahrnāz, daughter of Jamshid, wife of Zahak and Freydon
 Faranak, mother of Freydon
 Farangis, wife of Siyavash and mother of Kay Khosrow
 Katāyoun, a Roman princess, wife of Kay Visthasp and step-mother of Esfandiyar
 Gordafarid, a young Iranian princess who fought Sohrab
 Gordiye, a princess and warrior of House of Mehran, sister of Bahram Chobin, wife of Vistahm and eventually wife of Khosrow II Parviz
 Gol Shahr, wife of Piran Viseh
 Mah Afarid, a woman who slept with Iraj, mother of Manuchihr
 Manizheh, a Turanian princess, the lover of Bijan
 Mehrnaz, sister of Kay Kavus
 Homay, daughter of Kay Vishtasp
 Kay Homay, Queen of Queens of Iran

References 
Women in Shahnameh